Deerfield High School may refer to:
Deerfield Academy in Deerfield, Massachusetts
Deerfield High School (Illinois) in Deerfield, Illinois
Deerfield High School (Wisconsin) in Deerfield, Wisconsin 
Deerfield-Windsor School in Albany, Georgia